Murray William Burdan (born 2 May 1975 in Lower Hutt) is a former freestyle and butterfly swimmer from New Zealand, who competed at the 1996 Summer Olympics in Atlanta, United States, for his native country. His biggest success came in 1995, at the second edition of the FINA World SC Championships in Rio de Janeiro, Brazil, where Burdan won the gold medal with the Men's 4x100 Medley Relay Team.   This was a New Zealand record time and was the 4th fastest time ever recorded swimming achievements. He became the coach of a North Wellington Junior Football Club team called the Lightning Bolts.

References

External links
 

1975 births
Living people
Olympic swimmers of New Zealand
New Zealand male butterfly swimmers
New Zealand male freestyle swimmers
Swimmers at the 1996 Summer Olympics
Sportspeople from Lower Hutt
Medalists at the FINA World Swimming Championships (25 m)